The Metzler Visiting Professorship in International Finance, founded by the German private bank Bankhaus Metzler in 1992, is an academic exchange program between the Wharton School of the University of Pennsylvania in Philadelphia, Pennsylvania, and the Goethe University Frankfurt, Germany.

Previous Participants from the Wharton School (in chronological order)
 Wayne Guay
 Amir Yaron
 Philipp Illeditsch
 Iwan Barankay
 Nikolai Roussanov
 Ulrich Doraszelski
 Karen Lewis
 Gregory Nini
 Olivia S. Mitchell
 Richard Herring
 Itay Goldstein
 Franklin Allen
 Christian Leuz
 Alexander Muermann
 J. David Cummins
 A. Craig MacKinlay
 Bruce Grundy
 Robert E. Verrecchia
 Gordon M. Bodnar
 Paul R. Kleindorfer
 Neil Doherty
 Oded H. Sarig
 Richard Kihlstrom

Previous Participants from Goethe-University (in chronological order)
 Martin Götz
 Ralph Rogalla
 Christoph Meinerding
 Raimond Maurer
 Uwe Bloos
 Patrick Behr
 Michael Grote
 Marcel Tyrell
 Christian Laux
 Mark Wahrenburg
 Christian Schlag
 Heinrich Rommelfanger
 Ralf Ewert 
 Günther Gebhardt
 Jan Pieter Krahnen
 Reinhard H.Schmidt
 Roland Eisen
 Helmut Laux

External links 
 Official Website at Goethe-University Frankfurt
 

Academic transfer